Aleksander Gieysztor (17 July 1916 – 9 February 1999) was a Polish medievalist historian.

Life
Aleksander Gieysztor was born to a Polish family in Moscow, Russia, where his father worked as a railwayman. In 1921, the family relocated to Poland and settled in Warsaw. He graduated in history from the University of Warsaw in 1937.

He was married to Irena Gieysztor née Czarnecka, a fellow historian.

The Aleksander Gieysztor Prize of the Kronenberg Foundation and the Aleksander Gieysztor Academy of Humanities are named after him.

Awards
1944: Silver Cross of the Order Virtuti Militari
1961: Legion d'Honneur
1980: The Order of Merit of the Federal Republic of Germany
1994: Order of the White Eagle
1993: Commander's Cross with Star of the  Order of Polonia Restituta
1999: The Commander's Cross of the Order of Merit of the Italian Republic

Books 

 Historia Polski (co-author; 1947)
 Ze studiów nad genezą wypraw krzyżowych (1948)
 Zarys nauk pomocniczych historii (1948), a textbook used by a lot of generations of Polish students
 Zarys dziejów pisma łacińskiego (1972)
 Zamek Królewski w Warszawie (1973)
 Mitologia Słowian (1982) (wyd. Wydawnictwa Artystyczne i Filmowe, 1982 i 1986, w serii * Mitologie Świata).
 Dzieje Mazowsza do 1526 roku (co-author Henryk Samsonowicz)
 La Pologne et l’Europe au Moyen Age. Warszawa, P.W.N. Conférence au Centre Scientifique Parisien de l’Académie Polonaise des Sciences le 10 décembre 1962.
 Società e cultura nell’alto Medioevo Polacco. Ossolineum 1965. Conférence à l’Académie Polonaise des Sciences à Rome le 5 novembre 1963.

See also
 List of Poles

References

20th-century Polish historians
Polish male non-fiction writers
Recipients of the Order of Polonia Restituta
Commanders Crosses of the Order of Merit of the Federal Republic of Germany
1916 births
1999 deaths
Researchers of Slavic religion
Presidents of the Polish Academy of Sciences
Corresponding Fellows of the Medieval Academy of America
Corresponding Fellows of the British Academy
Recipients of the Order of the White Eagle (Poland)